Canada/USA Mathcamp is a five-week academic summer program for middle and high school students in mathematics.

Mathcamp was founded in 1993 by Dr. George Thomas, who believed that students interested in mathematics frequently lacked the resources and camaraderie to pursue their interest. Mira Bernstein became the director when Thomas left in 2002 to found MathPath, a program for younger students.

Mathcamp is held each year at a college campus in the United States or Canada.  Past locations have included the University of Toronto, the University of Washington, Colorado College, Reed College, University of Puget Sound, Colby College, the University of British Columbia, Mount Holyoke College, and the Colorado School of Mines. Mathcamp enrolls about 120 students yearly, 45-55 returning and 65-75 new.

The application process for new students includes an entrance exam (the "Qualifying Quiz"), personal essay, and two letters of recommendation, but no grade reports. The process is intended to ensure that the students who are most passionate about math come to camp. Admission is selective: in 2016, the acceptance rate was 15%.

Mathcamp courses cover various branches of recreational and college-level mathematics. Classes at Mathcamp come in four difficulty levels. The easier classes often include basic proof techniques, number theory, graph theory, and combinatorial game theory, while the more difficult classes cover advanced topics in abstract algebra, topology, theoretical computer science, category theory, and mathematical analysis. There are generally four class periods each day and five classes offered during each period intended for varying student interests and backgrounds.  Graduate student mentors teach most of the classes, while undergraduate junior counselors, all of them Mathcamp alumni, do most of the behind-the-scenes work. Mathcamp has had a number of renowned guest speakers, including John Conway, Avi Wigderson, and Serge Lang.

Culture
In 2004, some campers created Foodtongue, a constructed language in which every word is a word that means a food in the English language. One of the cardinal rules of the language is an agreed ban of direct translation.  Foodtongue remains popular among campers, and was compiled into an online wiki, updated and referenced by speakers of the language.

Notable alumni
 Scott Aaronson, American theoretical computer scientist
 Jennifer Balakrishnan, mathematician
 Sam Bankman-Fried, founder and former CEO of FTX
 Greg Brockman, co-founder and CTO of OpenAI
 Tamara Broderick, computer scientist
 Ivan Corwin, mathematician
 Sherry Gong, mathematician
 Shotaro Makisumi, mathematician and speedcuber
 Palmer Mebane, former World Puzzle Championship winner
 Mike Shulman, mathematician
 Sam Trabucco, former co-CEO of Alameda Research and a New York Times crossword puzzle constructor

See also

 MathPath
 Mathematical Olympiad Program
 AwesomeMath Program

References

External links
 
 Art of Problem Solving Mathcamp Forum

Mathematics summer camps
Summer camps in Canada
Summer camps in the United States